The Treaty of Fort Clark (also known as the Treaty with the Osage or the Osage Treaty) was signed at Fort Osage (then called Fort Clark) on November 10, 1808, (ratified on April 28, 1810) in which the Osage Nation ceded all the land east of the fort in Missouri and Arkansas north of the Arkansas River to the United States. The Fort Clark treaty and the Treaty of St. Louis in which the Sac (tribe) and Fox (tribe) ceded northeastern Missouri along with northern Illinois and southern Wisconsin were the first two major treaties in the newly acquired Louisiana Purchase. The affected tribes, upset with the terms, were to side with the British in the War of 1812. Following the settlement of that war, John C. Sullivan for the United States was to survey the ceded land in 1816 (adjusting it 23 miles westward to the mouth of the Kansas River to create the Indian Boundary Line west of which and south of which virtually all tribes were to be removed in the Indian Removal Act in 1830.

Background
When Lewis and Clark began their explorations of the Missouri River in 1804, Pierre Chouteau of the Chouteau fur trading family in St. Louis, Missouri took Osage chiefs to meet Thomas Jefferson who promised to open a government sanctioned trading post (then called the factory which the Osage could sell their goods at a government set price (ostensibly to keep them from being exploited by individual traders). The trading post would also have a blacksmith to provide utensils for the Native Americans. In early 1808, Meriwether Lewis led a group to the site of Fort Osage near Sibley, Missouri where they built the fort on a bluff above the Missouri River. Pierre Chouteau went about 150 miles south to Neosho, Missouri where the Osage had their principal village on the Osage River and brought the chiefs to Fort Osage. There they were presented with the terms of the treaty.

Terms

Ceded land
The treaty specifically cedes the following land:

And in consideration of the advantages which we derive from the stipulations contained in the foregoing articles, we, the chiefs and warriors of the Great and Little Osage, for ourselves and our nations respectively, covenant and agree with the United States, that the boundary line between our nations and the United States shall be as follows, to wit: beginning at fort Clark, on the Missouri, five miles above Fire Prairie, and running thence a due south course to the river Arkansas, and down the same to the Mississippi; hereby ceding and relinquishing forever to the United States, all the lands which lie east of the said line, and north of the southwardly bank of the said river Arkansas, and all lands situated northwardly of the river Missouri. And we do further cede and relinquish to the United States forever, a tract of two leagues square, to embrace fort Clark, and to be laid off in such manner as the President of the United States shall think proper.

Payment
According to the Article V, the Osage were to receive an annual payment:

Great Osage nation, the sum of eight hundred dollars [$13,559.32 today], and to the Little Osage nation, the sum of four hundred dollars[$6,779.66 today].

Ceded lands
In Article VI the lands ceded:

Beginning at fort Clark, on the Missouri, five miles above Fire Prairie, and running thence a due south course to the river Arkansas, and down the same to the Mississippi; hereby ceding and relinquishing forever to the United States, all the lands which lie east of the said line, and north of the southwardly bank of the said river Arkansas, and all lands situated northwardly of the river Missouri. And we do further cede and relinquish to the United States forever, a tract of two leagues square, to embrace fort Clark, and to be laid off in such manner as the President of the United States shall think proper.

Assignment to other tribes
Article VIII provided that the Osage land could be assigned to other tribes:

And the United States agree that such of the Great and Little Osage Indians, as may think proper to put themselves under the protection of fort Clark, and who observe the stipulations of this treaty with good faith, shall be permitted to live and to hunt, without molestation, on all that tract of country, west of the north and south boundary line, on which they, the said Great and Little Osage, have usually hunted or resided: Provided, The same be not the hunting grounds of any nation or tribe of Indians in amity with the United States; and on any other lands within the territory of Louisiana, without the limits of the white settlements, until the United States may think proper to assign the same as hunting grounds to other friendly Indians.

Aftermath
There were protests immediately from the tribe as there were claims that not all the proper representatives signed the document.  The Osage for the most part did not move to Fort Osage staying instead at their home in Neosho. Some tribesmen were to side with the British in the War of 1812. After the war, the Osage were summoned to Portage Des Sioux, Missouri where they affirmed the treaty in the Treaties of Portage des Sioux in 1815.

See also
 Osage Treaty (disambiguation), several treaties
 List of treaties
 Lovely's Purchase

Sources

External links
Kappler Project – Text of Treaty
The Osage: A Historical Sketch

Fort Clark
Fort Clark
1808 in the United States
Pre-statehood history of Missouri
Pre-statehood history of Arkansas
1810 treaties
1808 treaties